SumbandilaSat (sometimes just Sumbandila, formerly ZASAT-002, AMSAT designation SO-67), was a South African micro Earth observation satellite, launched on 17 September 2009 on a Soyuz-2 launch vehicle from the Baikonur Cosmodrome. The first part of the name, Sumbandila, is from the Venda language and means "lead the way".

The University of Stellenbosch, SunSpace and the CSIR (Council for Scientific and Industrial Research) were key players in constructing SumbandilaSat. The CSIR's Satellite Application Centre (CSIR-SAC) was responsible for operations, telemetry, tracking, control as well as data capturing.

SumbandilaSat was part of a closely integrated South African space programme and served as a research tool to investigate the viability of affordable space technology. Furthermore, the data was used to, amongst others, monitor and manage disasters such as flooding, oil spills and fires within Southern Africa.

In June 2011 the satellite was damaged during a solar storm. The damage caused the on-board computer and the camera to stop functioning. This has caused it to stop fulfilling its primary objective and it has been written off as a loss by SunSpace, its builder. The final data packet from the satellite was received on 14 September 2011.

Launch site
The launch site was the Baikonur Cosmodrome LC-31/6, which is located at the following coordinates:

Satellite specifications

* Courtesy of SunSpace

On-board experiments
It had a number of secondary experimental payloads on board:

Stellenbosch University — Architectural radiation experiment for commercial off the shelf devices and a software defined radio project.  
Nelson Mandela Metropolitan University — A forced vibrating string experiment.
University of KwaZulu-Natal — Very low frequency (VLF) radio experiment.
SA AMSAT — 2m/70 cm amateur radio transponder, parrot repeater and a voice beacon. The AMSAT designation of this payload is SO-67.

See also

 SUNSAT, first South African satellite

References

External links
 The Official SumbandilaSat Mission Blog
 Official Stellenbosch University Website
 SunSpace Website
 CSIR-SAC Website
 Space.gov.za

SO-67
Spacecraft launched in 2009
Spacecraft launched by Soyuz-2 rockets
Space program of South Africa
Spacecraft which reentered in 2021